Qarah Qiz (also Romanized as Qarah Qīz and Qareh Qīz) is a village in Nazlu-e Shomali Rural District, Nazlu District, Urmia County, West Azerbaijan Province, Iran. At the 2006 census, its population was 74, in 19 families.

References 

Populated places in Urmia County